Morgan Andrew Robertson (September 30, 1861 – March 24, 1915) was an American author of short stories and novels, and the self-proclaimed inventor of the periscope.

Early life
Robertson was the son of Andrew Robertson, a ship captain on the Great Lakes, and Amelia (née Glassford) Robertson.

Career

Morgan went to sea as a cabin boy and was in the merchant service from 1876 to 1899, during which he rose to first mate. Tired of life at sea, he studied jewelry making at Cooper Union in New York City and worked for 10 years as a diamond setter. When that work began to impair his vision, he turned to writing sea stories, placing his work in such popular magazines as McClure's and the Saturday Evening Post. Robertson never made much money from his writing, a circumstance that greatly embittered him. Nevertheless, from the early 1890s on he supported himself as a writer and enjoyed the company of artists and writers in a small circle of New York's bohemia.

Futility

Robertson is best known for his short novel Futility, or the Wreck of the Titan, first published in 1898. This story features an enormous British passenger liner called the SS Titan, which, deemed to be unsinkable, carries an insufficient number of lifeboats. On a voyage in the month of April, the Titan hits an iceberg and sinks in the North Atlantic, resulting in the loss of almost everyone on board. There are many close similarities with the real-life disaster of the RMS Titanic. The book was published 14 years before the actual Titanic, carrying an insufficient number of lifeboats, hit an iceberg on the night of April 14, 1912 and sank in the North Atlantic, killing most of the people on board. The many similarities between the fictional "Titan" and the real "Titanic" have fuelled much speculation ever since the tragedy.

Other works
In 1905, Robertson's book The Submarine Destroyer was released. It described a submarine that used a device called a periscope. Despite Robertson's later claims that he had "invented" a prototype periscope himself (and was refused a patent), Simon Lake and Harold Grubb had perfected the model used by the U.S. Navy by 1902, three years before Robertson's "prescient" novel.

In 1914, in a volume that also contained a new version of Futility, Robertson included a short story called "Beyond the Spectrum", which described a future war between the United States and the Empire of Japan, a popular subject at the time. Japan does not declare war but instead launches sneak attacks on United States ships en route to the Philippines and Hawaii; an invasion fleet about to launch a surprise attack on San Francisco is stopped by the hero using the weapon from a captured Japanese vessel. The title refers to an ultraviolet searchlight used by the Japanese, but invented by the Americans, to blind American crews.

Robertson authored Primordial / Three Laws and the Golden Rule, a novella about shipwrecked children growing up together and falling in love on a desert island. Fans of Edgar Rice Burroughs acknowledge Robertson's contribution to the works of Henry De Vere Stacpoole, particularly The Blue Lagoon. They believe that both Robertson's and Stacpoole's writings influenced Burroughs in his creation of Tarzan of the Apes.

Death
On the afternoon of March 24, 1915, Robertson was found dead in his room at the Alamac Hotel in Atlantic City, New Jersey. He was 53. It was  believed that he died of an overdose of paraldehyde.

Books and stories
This list may not be complete.

 Spun-Yarn: Sea Stories, (Harper & Brothers, 1898) – collection
 The Slumber of a Soul: A Tale of a Mate and a Cook
 The Survival of the Fittest
 A Creature of Circumstance
 The Derelict "Neptune"
 Honor Among Thieves
 Futility (M. F. Mansfield, 1898); revised 1912 and later published as "The Wreck of the Titan", or a compound title 
 "Where Angels Fear to Tread" and Other Stories of the Sea (The Century Co., 1899) – collection
 Where angels fear to tread
 The brain of the battle-ship
 The wigwag message
 The trade-wind
 Salvage
 Between the Millstones
 The Battle of the Monsters
 From the royal-yard down
 Needs must when the devil drives
 When Greek meets Greek
 Primordial
 Shipmates (D. Appleton & Company, 1901) – collection
 Ice Woman Diaries; A Witch’s Tin Key”
 The Fool Killer The Devil and His Due Polarity: A Tale of Two Brunettes A Tale of a Pigtail The Man at the Wheel The Day of the Dog At the End of the Man-rope A Fall From Grace The Dutch Port Watch On the Forecastle Deck Masters of Men (Curtis Publishing Co., 1901)
 Book I - The Age of Stone Book II - The Age of Iron Book III - Barbarism Book IV - Civilization Sinful Peck (Harper & Brothers, 1903) – novel
 Land Ho! (Harper & Brothers, 1896–1905) – collection
 The Dollar The Ship-Owner The Wave The Cook and the Captain The Line of Least Resistance The Lobster On Board The "Athol" The Magnetized Man The Mistake The Submarine Destroyer The Dancer On the Rio Grande Down to the Sea (Harper & Brothers, 1905) – collection
 The Closing of the Circuit A Cow, Two Men, and a Parson The Rivals A Chemical Comedy A Hero Of The Cloth The Subconscious Finnegan The Torpedo The Submarine Fifty Fathoms Down The Enemies The Vitality of Dennis The Helix The Shark The MutinyMcClure's Magazine and Metropolitan Magazine collaborated in 1914 to publish a four-volume set of short fiction. All of the stories were previously published, perhaps all but "The Wreck of the Titan" first published in magazines.
 The Wreck of the Titan, or Futility (McClure's and Metropolitan, 1914) – collection
 The Wreck of the Titan – 1898 novella Futility, revised 1912 as The Wreck of the Titan The Pirates Beyond the Spectrum In the Valley of the Shadow Three Laws and the Golden Rule (McClure's and Metropolitan, 1914) – collection
 The Three Laws and the Golden Rule – sequel to "Primordial"
 The Americans Dignity The Honeymoon Ship The Third Mate Through the Deadlight The Hairy Devil The Slumber of a Soul Honor Among Thieves The Survival of the Fittest A Creature of Circumstance Over the Border (McClure's and Metropolitan, 1914) – collection
 The Last Battleship Absolute Zero Over the Border The Fire Worshiper The Baby The Grinding of the Mills The Equation The Twins The Brothers Kimset The Mate of His Soul The Voices The Sleep Walker The Grain Ship (McClure's and Metropolitan, 1914) – collection
 The Grain Ship From the Darkness and the Depths Noah's Ark The Finishing Touch The Rock The Argonauts The Married Man The Triple Alliance Shovels and Bricks Extracts from Noah's LogsReferences in media and popular culture
Episode 17 (segment "Titan") of the American television show Beyond Belief: Fact or Fiction tells the story of Robertson (Harris Fisher) writing Futility, or the Wreck of the Titan/Futility.

The strange correlation between Robertson's Futility and the actual sinking of the RMS Titanic was referenced in the 2009/2010 video game Nine Hours, Nine Persons, Nine Doors.

The TV series One Step Beyond references an episode on Morgan Robertson "Night of April 14th" (season 1: episode 2) where a woman has nightmares of drowning in the ice cold ocean. Later, her husband plans a sailing trip from England to its destination in New York on the passenger ship Titanic. In the end of the show, host John Newland references Morgan Robertson in the similarities of his 1898 novella The Wreck of the Titan: Or, Futility to the actual Titanic.

In the 1996 PC Game Titanic: Adventure Out of Time, while taking a tour of the Titanic in the Turkish Baths, the character Trask describes and shows the character the book Futility'' and references how it gives him an ominous feeling about the ship.

References

External links

"Periscope Inventor Dead", Renfrew Mercury, Friday, April 2, 1915, p. 7
"The Titanic – Futility" at HistoryOnTheNet.com (archived 2012-12-22) – tabular data on the fictional and real ships
 

Online editions
Wreck of The Titan/Futility by Morgan Robertson
Primordial, and Three Laws and the Golden Rule by Morgan Robertson
 
 
 
 Read Books Online Website
 Online Library (many original scans of Robertson's work)

1861 births
1915 deaths
19th-century American novelists
20th-century American novelists
American male novelists
Drug-related deaths in New Jersey
Novelists from New York (state)
American male short story writers
19th-century American short story writers
19th-century American male writers
20th-century American short story writers
20th-century American male writers
Cooper Union alumni